JFK Olimps was a Latvian football club, playing in the top division of Latvian football. The club was from the city of Riga. According to a study from January 2011, the club was the youngest team in Europe, with an average age of 19.02 years.

History 

Olimps was founded in 2005 because there were only seven teams in the top division of the Latvian football league. It was made up of young (U-21) players from Skonto-2, Liepajas Metalurgs-2 and Ventspils-2. In the 2005 season they dropped from Virsliga. In 2006 they won 1. līga and returned to Virsliga. Despite finishing last in the 2007 Virslīga season, Olimps retained their place for 2008 thanks to the expansion of the league. In 2007 Olimps got to the Latvian Cup final thus earning a place in the UEFA cup qualifiers for the upcoming season.
The team was dissolved in 2012, although legally the club still exists.

League and Cup history 
JFK Olimps

JFK Olimps/ASK

JFK Olimps/RFS

Europe record

References

External links 
Weltfußballarchiv

 
Olimps
Olimps
Olimps
Olimps
2005 establishments in Latvia
2012 disestablishments in Latvia